Norman B. Saunders (born 27 October 1943) is a Turks and Caicos Islander former politician who served as the 3rd Chief Minister of the Turks and Caicos Islands from 4 November 1980 to 28 March 1985. Saunders is also the longest-serving Member of Parliament in the Turks and Caicos Islands, nearing 50 years of service, the first Chief Minister to win back-to-back elections with a resounding 8-3 victories at the polls in 1980 and 1984, the only ever politician in the nation to win as an independent candidate, and the first leader of the opposition.

Initial political career
In 1967, Saunders was elected as an MP for South Caicos under the Progressive National Party at the age of 23, making him the youngest elected official at the time. 

In 1976, after a 5-4-2 result in the election, and the two independent candidates siding with the People's Democratic Movement, Saunders became the first Leader of the Opposition in the Turks and Caicos Islands.

However, after 4 years, Saunders lead the Progressive National party to an 8-3 victory which resulted in the party getting re-elected as the government in 1985. At this point, Saunders led the party to both the largest mandate, and the first back-to-back victory in the nation, which has only happened two other times in history.

Conspiracy conviction
Saunders was arrested in March 1985 together with Commerce and Development Minister Stafford Missick. Saunders was alleged by the US Drug Enforcement Administration to have accepted $30,000 from undercover agents to ensure safe passage of drugs by permitting safe stopover refuelling of drug flights from Colombia to the United States. Video evidence showed Saunders accepting $20,000 from an agent. Saunders was convicted in July 1985 of conspiracy, though he was acquitted of the charge of conspiring to import drugs into the United States (which Missick was also convicted of). He was sentenced to eight years in prison and fined $50,000.
However, these charges were later dropped as Saunders was not found guilty.

Later political career
In January 1995, Saunders was elected back to Parliament as an independent candidate representing South Caicos South.  Saunders, along with his wife, Hon. Emily Saunders, earned and represented the two electoral districts in South Caicos, with Hon. Emily Saunders earning the South Caicos North seat.

In 2003, Saunders ran as a member of the Progressive National Party which formed the government. 

In 2007, Saunders was a part of, at the time, the largest mandate in the Turks and Caicos Islands' House of Assembly history, when the Progressive National Party won 13-2 seats. 

Saunders ran as a member of the Progressive National Party and held his seat upon retirement in 2016.

Post Retirement
In recognition of Saunders' 49 years of service, it was announced that the newly renovated South Caicos Airport will be named after Hon. Norman Saunders.

References

1943 births
Living people
Chief Ministers of the Turks and Caicos Islands
Heads of government who were later imprisoned
Politicians convicted of crimes
Progressive National Party (Turks and Caicos Islands) politicians